Gwyddgrug is a small village in Carmarthenshire, West Wales. It is located on the main A485 road south of New Inn.

References

Villages in Carmarthenshire